Albert Hosmer Bowker (September 8, 1919 – January 20, 2008) was an American statistician and university administrator. Born in Massachusetts, he worked at Stanford University in the late 1940s to early 1950s. In 1953, he was elected as a Fellow of the American Statistical Association. He then served as Chancellor of the City University of New York from 1963 to 1971.  During this period, in 1964, he married his second wife, Rosedith Sitgreaves, herself a notable statistician who had gone through the graduate program in statistics at Columbia University with Bowker and was at the time a professor at Columbia. He served as Chancellor of the University of California, Berkeley from 1971 to 1980 until serving as U.S. Assistant Secretary for Post-Secondary Education in the Carter administration. After 1 year, he went to the University of Maryland to serve as Dean of the School of Public Affairs. He died of pancreatic cancer in 2008.

Early life and education
Bowker was born on September 8, 1919, in Winchendon, Massachusetts. He attended the Massachusetts Institute of Technology where he received a B.S. in mathematics and later went to Columbia University where he received a Ph.D. in statistics.

References

1919 births
2008 deaths
American statisticians
Deaths from pancreatic cancer
Presidents of the Institute of Mathematical Statistics
Columbia Graduate School of Arts and Sciences alumni
Stanford University Department of Statistics faculty
University System of Maryland people
University of California, Berkeley faculty
People from Winchendon, Massachusetts
Leaders of the University of California, Berkeley
Chancellors of City University of New York
Fellows of the American Statistical Association
20th-century American academics